River Queen is a 2005 New Zealand-British war drama film directed by Vincent Ward and starring Samantha Morton, Kiefer Sutherland, Cliff Curtis, Temuera Morrison and Stephen Rea. The film opened to mixed reviews but performed well at the box office in New Zealand.

Plot
The film takes place in New Zealand in 1868 during Titokowaru's War phase of the New Zealand Wars between the Māori and New Zealand colonial forces. Sarah O'Brien (Samantha Morton) has grown up among soldiers in a frontier garrison on Te Awa Nui, the Great River. Pregnant at 16 by a young Maori boy, she gives birth to a son. When, seven years later, her son, Boy, is kidnapped by his Maori grandfather, Sarah is distraught.
Abandoned by her soldier father, Sarah's life becomes a search for her son. Her only friend, Doyle (Kiefer Sutherland) is a broken-down soldier without the means to help her.

Lured to the ill rebel chief Te Kai Po's village by the chance to see her child, Sarah finds herself falling in love with Boy's uncle, Wiremu (Cliff Curtis), and increasingly drawn to the village way of life.

Using medical skills she learned from her father, Sarah heals Te Kai Po (Temuera Morrison) and begins to reconcile with her son (Rawiri Pene). But her idyllic time at the village is shattered when she realises that she has healed the chief only to hear him declare war on the Colonials, men she feels are her friends, her only family. Her desperation deepens when she realises that Boy intends to prove himself in war, refusing to go back down river with her.
As the conflict escalates, Sarah finds herself at the centre of the storm, torn by the love she feels for Boy and Wiremu, anguished over the attachments she still has to the white man's world, and sickened by the brutality she witnesses on either side.

And when the moment comes, Sarah must choose where she belongs; will she be forced back into the white man's way of life, or will she have the courage to follow the instincts that are telling her where she truly belongs?

Cast
 Samantha Morton as Sarah O'Brien
 Kiefer Sutherland as Doyle
 Cliff Curtis as Wiremu
 Temuera Morrison as Te Kai Po
 Stephen Rea as Francis
 Anton Lesser as Major Baine
 Rawiri Pene as Sarah's son
 Danielle Cormack as Viola

Production
Sam Neill was originally favoured by Vincent Ward to be cast in a leading role, but he declined.

Director Vincent Ward was dismissed from the film towards the end of the shoot to be replaced by cinematographer Alun Bollinger and then in an unusual reversal, was rehired just weeks later for six months of editing and additional shooting in both New Zealand and England. Primary filming was done on the Whanganui River.

The film features the song "Danny Boy" sung in Maori and English. The film is set in 1868, and the lyrics for "Danny Boy" were written in 1910 and adapted to the traditional Irish melody "Londonderry Air". It is possible the melody was known in New Zealand at the time, but another 42 years were to pass before the lyrics were written by Frederick Weatherly.

Reception
The film topped the New Zealand Box Office on its first weekend of release.

Alexander Bisley of The Dominion Post says "River Queen convinces that you don't have to be indigenous to tell indigenous stories. Ward who lived for 18 months as the sole Pakeha (person of European descent) in a remote Maori community in the Ureweras, deserves a lot of mana (respect). This is his story, this is my story, this is your story - every New Zealander should see River Queen."

Awards and recognition

Fair International Film Festival 2007 
 Best Artistic Achievements Award

New Zealand Screen Awards 2006
 Won: Best Achievement in Cinematography: Alun Bollinger
 Won: Best Achievement in Costume Design: Barbara Darragh
 Nominated: Best Performance by an Actor in a Leading Role: Cliff Curtis
 Nominated: Best Achievement in Production Design: Rick Kofoed
 Nominated: Best Performance by an Actress in a Leading Role: Samantha Morton
 Nominated: Best Performance by Actor in a Supporting Role: Rawiri Pene
 Nominated: Best Picture: Don Reynolds, Chris Auty

Shanghai International Film Festival 2006
 Won: Golden Goblet, Best Music: Karl Jenkins

References

External links
 

2005 films
2000s adventure films
2000s war drama films
2000s action drama films
British action films
British adventure films
British war drama films
New Zealand Wars films
Films about child abduction
Films about dysfunctional families
Films directed by Vincent Ward
Films shot in England
Films shot in New Zealand
Films set in 1868
Films set in jungles
Films set in New Zealand
New Zealand drama films
War adventure films
Taranaki wars
2005 drama films
Films about Māori people
2000s English-language films
2000s British films